The below list gives an overview of the stories in Rumi's Masnavi, as it appears in Reynold A. Nicholson's translation.

Book I

Preface (in prose)
Proem
The King and the Handmaiden
The Greengrocer and the Parrot
The Jewish King whose Vizier contrived a plot against the Christians
The Caliph and Laylá
The description of Mohammed in the Gospel
Another Jewish King who persecuted the Christians
The punishment inflicted on a man who scoffed at Mohammed
The Wind which destroyed the people of ‘Ad .
The Lion and the Beasts of chase
Azrael and the man who took refuge with Solomon Solomon and the Hoopoe
The Fall of Adam
The Holy War against the Flesh
The Caliph ‘Umar and the Ambassador
How Adam acknowledged, while Iblis denied, responsibility for sin
“And He is with you, wheresoever you be”
“Let him who desires to sit with God sit with the Súfís”
The Merchant and the Parrot which gave him a message to the parrots of India
The Spiritual Birds that are Divine Intelligences
Commentary on a saying of Faridu’ddín ‘Attár .
The respect paid to Moses by Pharaoh’s magicians
Commentary on a saying of Saná’í, and a Discourse on a Tradition of the Prophet concerning the jealousy of God
The harmfulness of being honoured by the people
“Whatsoever God wills cometh to pass”
The Story of the Harper
Explanation of a Tradition of the Prophet concerning Divine inspiration
A Story of ‘A’isha and the Prophet
Commentary on a verse of Saná’i
“Take advantage of the coolness of the spring season”
The Moaning Pillar
A miracle performed by the Prophet in the presence of Abú Jahl
The Prodigal for whom the angels pray
The munificent Caliph
The Arab of the Desert and his Wife
False saints
The power of Faith
Light and colour
Explanation of the Tradition that women prevail over the wise man, while the ignorant man prevails over them
The mystery of Moses and Pharaoh
“He has lost this life and the life to come”
The prophet Sálih and the people of Thamúd
The barrier between the righteous and the wicked
What is meat to the saint is poison to the disciple
The Divine Bounty and those who beg for it
The two kinds of “poor”
The World's lovers
The proverb, “If you commit fornication, commit it with a free woman, and if you steal, steal a pearl”
The Grammarian and the Boatman
The Spiritual Guide
The Prophet's injunction to ‘Alí
The man of Qazwín who wanted to have a lion tattooed on his shoulder
The wolf and the fox who went to hunt with the Lion .
The man who knocked at his friend’s door and, on being asked who he was, answered, “‘Tis I”
Description of Unification
Noah as the God-man
Why the Súfís who know God are seated in front of kings
Joseph and the guest-friend who could find no suitable gift for him except a mirror
Mohammed and the scribe who wrote down the Qur'anic Revelations
Bal’am son of Bá’úr
Hárút and Márút
The deaf man and his sick neighbour
Iblis the originator of analogical reasoning applied to the Word of God
Mystical experiences must be kept hidden from the vulgar
The contention between the Greek and Chinese artists
The Vision of Zayd
Luqmán and his fellow-servants
The conflagration in Medina in the days of the Caliph 'Umar
'Alí and the infidel who spat in his face
'Alí and his murderer
The self-conceit shown by Adam towards Iblís
The unworldliness of the Prophet

Book II
Preface (in prose)
Proem
The Caliph ‘Umar and the man who thought he saw the new moon
The fool who entreated Jesus to bring some bones to life
The Sufi who enjoined the servant to take care of his ass
The King and his lost falcon
Shaykh Ahmad son of Khizrúya and his creditors
The answer of an ascetic who was warned not to weep, lest he should become blind
The peasant who stroked a lion in the dark
The Súfis who sold the traveller’s ass
The greedy insolvent
Parable for those who say “if”
The man who killed his mother because he suspected her of adultery
The King and his two slaves
The King's retainers who envied his favourite slave
The falcon amongst the owls
The thirsty man who threw bricks into the water
The man who planted a thornbush in the road and delayed to uproot it
Dhu'l-Nún and the friends who came to visit him in the mad-house
The sagacity of Luqmán
The reverence of Bilqís for the message of Solomon which was brought to her by the hoopoe
The philosopher who showed disbelief in the Qur’án
Moses and the shepherd
The Amír and the sleeping man into whose mouth a snake had crept
The fool who trusted the bear
The blind beggar who said, “I have two blindnesses”
Moses and the worshipper of the golden calf
Galen and the madman
The cause of a bird's flying and feeding with a bird that is not of its own kind
Mohammed's visit to the sick Companion
The gardener who separated three friends in order to chastise them singly
Báyazíd and the Shaykh who said, “I am the Ka’ba”
The novice who built a new house
Dalqak and the Sayyid-i Ajall
The Saint who rode a cock-horse
The dog and the blind mendicant
The Police Inspector and the drunken man
Iblís and Mu’áwiya
The Cadi who wept whilst he was being installed
The bitter grief of a man who missed the congregational prayers
The thief who escaped because his accomplice gave a false alarm
The Hypocrites and the Mosque of Opposition
The true believer's stray camel
The four Indians who lost their prayers
The Ghuzz Turcomans and the two villagers
The self-conceit and ingratitude shown by the worldly towards the prophets and saints
The old man who complained to the doctor
Júhí and the child
The boy who was afraid of an effeminate man
The archer and the horseman
The Arab of the desert and the philosopher
The miracles of Ibráhim son of Adham
The beginning of the gnostic's illumination
The stranger who reviled the Shaykh
The man who declared that God would not punish his sins, and Shu’ayb's answer to him
The answer of the Prophet to ‘A’isha, who said that he performed the ritual prayer in unclean places
The mouse and the camel
The miracles of a dervish who was accused of theft
The garrulous, greedy, and somnolent Súfí, and his reply to the Shaykh who enjoined him to observe moderation
The nature of intuitive knowledge
John the Baptist and Jesus
Mute eloquence
The search for the Tree of Life
How four persons quarrelled about grapes, which were known to each of them by a different name
How Mohammed established unity amongst the Ansár
Solomon and the birds
The ducklings that were fostered by a hen
The miracles wrought by an ascetic in the desert

Book III
Preface (in prose)
Proem
The Travellers who ate the young Elephant
Bilál’s mispronunciation in chanting the call to prayer
Moses instructed by God how he should pray
The response to sincere prayer
The Countryman and the Townsman
The people of Sabá and the Prophets
How Jesus came forth from his cell and healed the sick
The Falcon and the Ducks
The people of Zarwán
Majnún and Laylá’s dog
The Jackal that fell into the dyeing-vat and pretended to be a Peacock
The Braggart who pretended that he had dined well
Bal’am the son of Bá’úr
“And thou wilt surely know them in the perversion of their speech”
Hárút and Márút
Pharaoh's dream of the coming of Moses
The Mughal and the Egyptians
The conception and birth of Moses
The Snake-catcher and the frozen Snake
Pharaoh and Moses
The two Magicians who summoned their father from the grave
Comparison of the Qur’án to the rod of Moses
The Elephant in the dark house
Noah and Canaan
Infidelity and Predestination
The Barber and the Man with grizzled hair
The answer of Zayd to his assailant
The Companions of the Prophet and the Qur’án
The Lover who read a love-letter in the presence of his Beloved
The Poor Man who prayed that he might gain a lawful livelihood without work
Knowledge and Opinion
The Teacher who fancied he was ill
The Dervish who broke his vow
The far-seeing Goldsmith
The Magicians whom Pharaoh threatened to punish
The complaint of the Mule to the Camel
The Ass of ‘Uzayr
The Shaykh who showed no grief at the death of his sons
The Blind Man who regained his sight when he read the Qur’án
The patience of Luqmán
Buhlúl and the Dervish
The Visions and Miracles of Daqúqi
Moses and Khizr
The flight of Jesus from the Fool
The Children's Tale of the Three Worldlings
The Hares and the Elephant
Noah and the building of the Ark
The Thief who said he was beating a Drum
The meaning of Prudence
The Vow made by the Dogs every winter
The Divine Providence manifested in the creation of Hell
Kings compared to the Báb-i Saghír at Jerusalem
The Súfí who fell into ecstasy on seeing an empty food-wallet
Jacob's love for Joseph
The Amir and the Slave who took delight in the ritual Prayer
The Faith of the Worldly
Hidden Saints
Anas and the Prophet's napkin
How the Prophet saved a caravan of Arabs from death in the Desert
Miracles wrought by the Prophet on the same occasion
Need and distress call forth the Bounty of God
The Babe that bore witness to the Prophet
The Eagle that carried off the Prophet's boot
The Man who asked Moses to teach him the language of Beasts and Birds
The Woman whose twenty children all died in infancy
Why Hamza in his old age refused to protect himself with a coat of mail
The advantages of Deliberation
The death of Bilál
The World and the Body
Statute and Analogy
The reverence due to the Shaykhs from their disciples
Conventional and intuitive knowledge
Faná and Baqá
The Wakíl of Bukhárá and his Master
The appearance of the Holy Spirit in human shape to Mary, the Mother of Jesus
The most beautiful City
The Lover in the haunted Mosque
The worldliness of Galen
How Satan deceived the Quraysh
The Boy who beat a tomtom in order to scare a Camel on which they were beating a drum
Comparison of the true Believer suffering tribulation to peas being boiled in a pot
The Mathnawí and its critics
The outer and inner sense of the Qur’án
Why the Saints take refuge in mountains and caves
How the mountains joined in the song of David
The Foal that would not drink
The cry of the Devil
How each element in the Body is drawn to its original source, and the Soul likewise
The Prophet and the Captives
The Gnat and the Wind in the presence of Solomon
The perfidious Lover

Book IV
Preface (in prose)
Proem
The perfidious Lover (continued)
The Preacher who prayed for the wicked
The answer of Jesus to the question, “What is the hardest thing to bear?”
The Súfí who caught his wife with a strange man
The Names of God
Comparison of the World to a bath-stove
The Tanner who fainted on smelling otto and musk
The Jew who tempted ‘Alí
The building of the Farther Mosque (the Temple of Solomon)
“The Faithful are naught but brothers”
The unspoken Sermon of the Caliph ‘Uthmán
Man the Macrocosm
Comparison of the Prophet and the Moslem saints to the Ark of Noah
Solomon and Bilqís
The Miracles of Shaykh ‘Abdullah Maghribí
The Druggist and the Clay-eater
The Dervish and the Carrier of firewood
Ibráhím ibn Adham and his abandonment of his Kingdom
The thirsty man who climbed a walnut-tree and dropped walnuts into the water
Halíma and the infant Mohammed
The Worldly and the Spiritual
The Poet and the two Viziers
Pharaoh and Hámán
The Demon who sat on the throne of Solomon
How Cain learned the grave-digger’s trade
The Súfi who contemplated the beauty of the Garden in his own heart
Worldly knowledge and power a dangerous weapon in the hands of the wicked
“O thou that wrappest thyself”
The Slave whose allowance was reduced
Man half angel and half beast
Majnún and his she-camel
The Divine and the Thief who stole his turban
The World's enticement and warning
The food of the Saints
Death the touchstone of pretension
The hypocritical Encomiast
The divine Physicians
How Abd Yazíd (Báyazíd) Bistámí predicted the birth of Abu‘l-Hasan Kharraqáni
How the wind blew perversely against Solomon
Abu’l-Hasan at the tomb of Abú Yazíd
The Man who took counsel with his enemy
The Prophet's appointment of a Young Man of Hudhayl to command the army
The Ecstasy of Báyazíd
The wise, the half-wise, and the foolish
The Three Fishes
The ablutionary Prayers
The Man who failed to profit by the wise counsels of a Bird
Moses and Pharaoh as types of Reason and Imagination
The spiritual vision in which all the senses become one
Moses and Pharaoh
The World's assault on the Unseen
The Purification of the Heart
“I was a Hidden Treasure”
“Speak ye unto men according to the measure of their understandings
The Prophet’s promise of Paradise to ‘Ukkásha
The royal Falcon and the Old Woman
‘Alí’s advice to the Mother whose child was in danger of falling from the top of the water-spout
Like attracts like
The Prophet and the Arab Chiefs
Paradise and Hell are the effects of Divine Mercy and Wrath
The Argument between the Atheist and the Mystic
The Purpose of Creation
Why Moses was loved by God
The King and his Boon-companion and the Courtier who acted as intercessor
Abraham rejects the proffered help of Gabriel
The mystery of Life and Death
Body and Spirit
The Prince and the Witch of Kabúl
The Ascetic who laughed while the people were dying of hunger
Live in harmony with Universal Reason
The Sons of ‘Uzayr
“Verily, I ask pardon of God seventy times every day”
The weakness of the discursive Reason
Submission to the Saints
The Mule and the Camel
The Egyptian and the Israelite
The Pear-tree of Illusion
The spiritual Evolution of Man
Divine immanence in Creation
Dhu’l-Qarnayn and Mount Qaf
The Ant that saw the pen writing
The Prophet's vision of Gabriel in his real form

Book V
Preface (in prose)
Proem
Parable of the Four Birds
Description of the Duck
The Prophet and the Greedy Infidel
The Light which is the Food of the Spirit
Description of the Peacock
Diversity of Intelligences
The Arab of the Desert and his Dog
The Sage and the Peacock
“No monkery in Islam”
Description of the Crow
The Gazelle in the Donkey-stable
Muammad Khwárizmsháh and the people of Sabzawár
Description of the Cock
“The Lowest of the Low”
The two Worlds
The value of Works
“And He is with you”
The Man who claimed to be a Prophet
The Devoted Lover
The Disciple who imitated the Shaykh
The Maidservant and the Ass
Parable of the Parrot which is taught to speak by seeing its image in a mirror
The Puppies that barked before they were born
The People of Zarwán
The Creation of Adam
The illusion of causes
Death and Resurrection
The infinite mercy of God
The Story of Ayáz
Laylá and Majnún
The Ascetic and his jealous Wife
The repentance of Nasúh
The Fox and the Ass
The Ass that envied the Arab horses
The Ascetic who made trial of his trust in God
Parable of the Camel
The effeminate Youth
The Man who was afraid of being taken for an Ass
Shaykh Muhammad Sar-razí of Ghazna
The Disciple in dreadof hunger
The Cow in the green Island
The Christian ascetic who went about with a lamp in the day-time
Debate between a Moslem and a Magian on the subject of free-will
The Dervish who reproached God
The beauty of Laylá
A story of Júhí
The Infidel and Báyazíd
The Muezzin with the harsh voice
The Cat and the Meat
The Amír and the Ascetic
Ziyá-yi Dalq and his Brother
Dalqak's game of Chess with the Sháh of Tirmid
The Prophet on Mount Hirá
The World that is living, speaking, and hearing
The Guest who took offence and departed
A Father's advice to his married Daughter
The cowardly Súfí
‘Iyádí and the Greater Warfare
The Man who tormented his Carnal Soul
The Caliph and the Captain
The Magicians of Pharaoh

Book VI
Preface (in prose)
Proem
The Bird on the City-wall
The temptation of Free-will
The Hindu Slave and his Master’s daughter
The Thief who put out the light
The Story of Ayáz (continued)
The Fowler and the Bird
The Man whose Ram was stolen
The Watchman who cried out after the Robbers had gone
The Lover who fell asleep
The Turkish Amír and the Minstrel
‘A’isha and the Blind Man
“Die before ye die”
A Poet's rebuke to the Shí’ites of Aleppo
Parable of the Ant
The Man who gave the drum-call for breakfast at midnight
The Story of Bilál
The Story of Hilál
The Horse that went backward
Mohammed and Jesus
The ugly old Hag who wanted a Husband
The Dervish and the Man of Gílán
The Beggar and the House where nothing could be got
The Man who was desperately ill, and the Story of the Súfi and the Cadi
Sultan Mahmud and the Hindú Boy
The Turk and the Tailor
The Fakir and the Hidden Treasure
Shaykh Abu ‘l-Hasan Kharraqáni and his Disciple
Man the vicegerent of God
The Three Travellers and the sweetmeat
The Camel, the Ox, and the Ram
Dalqak and the King of Tirmid
The Mouse and the Frog
Sultan Mahmúd and the Night-thieves
The Sea-cow and the Pearl
‘Abdu ‘l-Ghawth and the Peris
The insolvent Dervish and the Police Inspector of Tabríz
Ja’far-i Tayyár's irresistible attack on a fortress
Parable of the man who sees double
The Khwárizmsháh and the beautiful Horse
The imprisonment of Joseph
The Three Princes who fell in love with the portrait of the Princess of China
The Sadr-i Jahán of Bukhárá and the Jurist
Story of two Brothers
The King who forced a learned Doctor to drink wine with him
Imra’u ‘l-Qays and the King of Tabúk
The Man who dreamed of a Hidden Treasure
The Cadi and the Wife of Júhí
The Prophet and ‘Alí
Hell and the true Believer
The Story of Nimrod
The miracles of Shaybán Rá’í
The Man who left his property to the laziest of his three Sons
Parable of the Child and the Bogle

References
 The Mathnawí of Jalálu'ddín Rumi, edited from the oldest manuscripts available, with critical notes, translation and commentary by Reynold A. Nicholson, in 8 volumes, London: Messrs Luzac & Co., 1925-1940. Contains the text in Persian. First complete English translation of the Mathnawí.

Works by Rumi
Persian poems
Sufi literature
Masnavi